State Road 175 (NM 175) is a  state highway in the US state of New Mexico. NM 175's western terminus is at Gulf Road northwest of Oil Center, and the eastern terminus is at NM 8 north of Oil Center.

Major intersections

See also

References

175
Transportation in Lea County, New Mexico